is a Japanese rugby union player who plays as a hooker.

In his home country he plays for the Coca-Cola Red Sparks whom he joined in 2011.   He was also named in the first ever  squad which will compete in Super Rugby from the 2016 season.   Arita is a Japanese international who debuted against Kazakhstan in 2012, but did not make the squad for the 2015 Rugby World Cup.

References

1989 births
Living people
Japanese rugby union players
Japan international rugby union players
Rugby union hookers
Coca-Cola Red Sparks players
Sportspeople from Fukuoka (city)
Sunwolves players
Kobelco Kobe Steelers players